This is a list of programmes currently, formerly, and soon to be broadcast on Polsat in Poland.

Currently broadcast by Polsat

News
 Prognoza pogody (1993-present) 
 Sport (1993-present)
 Wydarzenia (2004-present)

Soap opera
 Pierwsza miłość (2004-present) 
 Samo Życie (2002-2011)

Drama
 Bones (2008-present)
 CSI: Kryminalne zagadki Miami (2006-present)
 CSI: Kryminalne zagadki Nowego Jorku (2006-present)
 Grey's Anatomy (2005-present)
 Tylko miłość (2007-2009)

Sitcom
Daleko od noszy (2003-present)
I kto tu rządzi? (2007-2008)
Rodzina zastępcza (1999-2009)
Świat według Kiepskich (1999-present)

Reality/variety
 Gwiezdny cyrk (2008-present)
 Misiek Koterski Show (2008-present)
 Piotr Bałtroczyk przedstawia (2007-present)
 Przebojowe dzieci (2008-present)
 Soapstar Superstar (2007-present)

Game shows
 Power of 10 (2008-present)

Interactive game shows
 Hugo
 Miasto zwycięzców (2007-present)
 Wielka wygrana (2006-present)

Talk show
 Nasze dzieci

Entertainment news programmes
 Interwencja  
 Pasjonaci 
 Się kręci

Sports
 Formula One 
 UEFA Euro 2008 (7 June – 29 June)
 Volleyball

Polsat
 
Polsat